Sir Alexander William Younger  (born 4 July 1963) is a former career British intelligence officer for the Secret Intelligence Service (MI6) who served as the Chief of the Secret Intelligence Service, succeeding Sir John Sawers on his retirement. In April 2019, the government extended Younger's contract to maintain stability through the Brexit negotiations, a move which made him the longest-serving MI6 chief in 50 years.

Early life
Born in Westminster, London on 4 July 1963, Younger takes pride in his Scottish heritage. He was educated at Marlborough College before graduating from the University of St Andrews with a degree in economics.

Career

Military service
Younger was sponsored by the British Army through university. He was commissioned into the Royal Scots on 5 September 1986 as a second lieutenant (on probation). As a university candidate he was a full-time student at university and trained in his spare time. On 10 December 1986, he transferred to the Scots Guards.

On 16 June 1987, his commission was confirmed and dated to 5 September 1986; this signified the start of his full-time military service. He was granted seniority in the rank of second lieutenant from 9 April 1983. He was promoted to lieutenant, which was back dated to 5 September 1986, and was granted seniority from 9 April 1985. He was promoted to captain on 5 April 1989. On 10 April 1990, he transferred to the Regular Army Reserve of Officers, thereby ending his active military service.

Intelligence work

Younger joined MI6 in 1991. He joined the service at the same time as Richard Tomlinson, who in his book The Big Breach, portrayed him as "Spencer", a St Andrews graduate and former Scots Guard who was recruited while working for the Halo Trust in Afghanistan. Younger served in the Middle East and Afghanistan. He became Head of Counter-Terrorism in 2009, in which role he was involved in security for the London Olympics 2012. He became Deputy Director in 2012, before being nominated as Chief in October 2014.

In a leaked list of 160 MI6 agents—which was originally believed to have been released by Richard Tomlinson, although government officials subsequently "acknowledged that the list did not come from Mr Tomlinson"—Alex Younger is mentioned as having been posted to Vienna in 1995. As of 2015, Younger was paid a salary of between £160,000 and £164,999 by MI6, making him one of the 328 most highly paid people in the British public sector at that time.

Notable speeches and interviews

Russia
In 2016 Younger said cyber-attacks, propaganda and subversion from hostile states pose a fundamental threat to European democracies including the UK. In a rare speech by an MI6 chief while in office, Younger did not specifically name Russia, but left no doubt that this was the target of his remarks. In 2020 Younger described continuing Russian ambition to subvert Western democratic process through disinformation, which he ascribed to Russian fear of the quality of Western institutions and alliances. He advocated strong defences but warned that we should not magnify the effect of these relatively crude and unsophisticated attacks by exaggerating their effect.  Nor should Western democracies allow these attacks to diminish their own responsibility for dealing with the things that caused division in their own countries. "The Russians did not create the things that divide us, we did that to ourselves".

China and technology
In December 2018, Younger raised concerns about Huawei's role in the UK's new 5G mobile network. In 2020 he forecast continuing ideological divergence between the West and China given the premium that the Chinese Communist Party placed in preserving their interests. He said that this would have significant security consequences that the West should anticipate and organise against. But it should also recognise the need for coexistence given that two value systems were like to occupy one planet for the foreseeable future. He also called for the West to refocus on its own strengths: the quality of its alliances and innovation, rather than simply lamenting the rise of a competitor.

Human rights
In an October 2020 interview with Angelina Jolie in Time magazine, Younger voiced fears that the international consensus on human rights norms had broken down.  It was now up to like-minded liberal democracies to create consequences for the worst violators.  Separately, he acknowledged that Afghanistan's future had to be determined by politics but warned that the country had changed and that the Taliban should understand that Afghans, particularly women, would have no tolerance for a reversion to the way things were.

Academic freedom
In December 2018 Younger gave a rare speech at the University of St Andrews, making emphasis of the need for fourth-generation espionage and fusing human skills with technical innovation. This was the second public speech in the four years since his appointment as chief of the MI6. During the speech Younger addressed the case of Matthew Hedges, a British university student who was arrested in the UAE.  Younger said he was perplexed by what has happened and that there were some frank conversations ahead between Britain and the UAE. Hedges was later pardoned by UAE President Khalifa bin Zayed Al Nahyan and reunited with his wife in the UK.

Counter terrorism
In September 2020, speaking to the Financial Times, Younger was asked if the UK had wrongly prioritised counter terrorism at the expense of coverage of Russia and China.  Younger said that he supported the government's very low tolerance for instability driven by terrorism because it was such a gross violation of social norms.  He described the recent destruction of the ISIS caliphate in Syria as a "High Point", but he warned that terrorism had now become more autonomous and spontaneous, and remained lethal.

On 16 February 2019, when interviewed by the British press, Younger was asked about the wives of British ISIS fighters stuck in Syria after the fall of the caliphate. He acknowledged their plight, but warned that such people would have acquired skills and connections that made them dangerous to the public. Home Secretary Sajid Javid later chose to strip Shamima Begum, who had married an ISIS fighter, of her British citizenship, leaving the future of her and her son unclear. Richard Barrett, who is a former director of global counter-terrorism at MI6, told the press that Begum should be given a chance to rebuild her life with her son. He also suggested it would be unreasonable to expect the Syrian Defence Force to look after her indefinitely. Barrett stated that British society should be strong enough to reabsorb her. He said the immediate reaction of the British government "has been a complete lack of concern for her plight".

Portrayal in popular culture
In August 2019 Younger and his colleagues visited the James Bond film set of No Time to Die at Pinewood Studios in Buckinghamshire, where he shook hands with several actors, including Ralph Fiennes who played Younger's fictional counterpart "M".

Personal life

Sailing, hiking and dogs
Younger enjoys mountain hiking and sailing just like Sir Mansfield Cumming, a Royal Navy officer who lived on a boat in Southampton before becoming the head of MI6 in 1909. He has three dogs.

Family
Younger married Sarah Hopkins in Borgo a Mozzano, Tuscany, in 1993. On 30 March 2019, Younger's son, Sam, was killed in a motoring accident in Stirlingshire.

Honours
Younger was appointed Companion of the Order of St Michael and St George (CMG) in the 2011 Birthday Honours and Knight Commander of the Order of St Michael and St George (KCMG) in the 2019 Birthday Honours for services to the United Kingdom.

See also
 Mansfield Cumming
 Sidney Reilly
 William Melville
 Charles Cumming

References

External links
 "James Bond is both a blessing and curse, says spy chief Alex Younger" - video The Guardian, 8 December 2016
 MI6 chief Alex Younger: Enemies in 'perpetual confrontation' Sky News December 2018
 "UK is in technological arms race with its foes, warns MI6 chief Alex Younger" - video, Nick Hopkins, The Guardian, 3 December 2018
 The Irish Times | Alex Younger

Positions held

1963 births
Living people
People educated at Marlborough College
Chiefs of the Secret Intelligence Service
Knights Commander of the Order of St Michael and St George
Royal Scots officers
Scots Guards officers
Alumni of the University of St Andrews
People from Westminster
20th-century British Army personnel
Military personnel from London